Phil Ryan Cardella (born July 9, 1976)  is an American mixed martial arts fighter. He formerly fought as a lightweight in the World Extreme Cagefighting organization. All but one of Cardella’s triumphs have come by first-round submission.

He holds a 3rd degree black belt in Brazilian Jiu Jitsu under Relson Gracie, as well as a 3rd degree black belt in Taekwondo and a 2nd Degree black belt in Hapkido.

He served as an assault amphibious vehicle crewman in the United States Marine Corps from 1994 to 1998, during which he also taught primary marksmanship and combat water safety. Today he continues to work with various branches of the U.S. Military to train them in hand-to-hand combatives using Brazilian Jiu Jitsu.

Phil was the first American fighter to represent the Relson Gracie Team in MMA competition. Relson Gracie has been in Phil's corner during many of his MMA matches.
Phil is the founder of the Relson Gracie Jiu-Jitsu associations in Texas, and has since moved to Florida to lead his team and community there as the Head Instructor of Relson Gracie Jiu-Jitsu Florida, a martial arts school specializing in Brazilian Jiu-Jitsu.

WEC career

While his record for the WEC reads 0-2, Cardella was a winner in the minds of several fans and critics after his fight against Danny Castillo ended a split decision.
In his fight with Castillo, he became the first fighter in the WEC to win more than one round on a judge's scorecard, purely by scoring points with an offensive guard. He made his WEC return at WEC 42 on August 9, 2009, losing to Ed Ratcliff by unanimous decision.

Coaching
Cardella has been known to coach a number of professional MMA fighters, including UFC contender Kamal Shalorus, Strikeforce top title contender Tim Kennedy, former UFC star Roger Huerta, and Bellator fighter Chris Spicer.

Mixed martial arts record

|-
| Loss
| align=center| 8–5
| Ran Weathers
| KO (punch)
| Shark Fights 6: Stars & Stripes
| 
| align=center| 1
| align=center| 0:36
| Amarillo, TX, United States
| 
|-
| Loss
| align=center| 8–4
| Ed Ratcliff
| Decision (unanimous)
| WEC 42:Torres vs. Bowles
| 
| align=center| 3
| align=center| 5:00
| Las Vegas, Nevada, United States
| 
|-
| Win
| align=center| 8–3
| Johnny Flores
| Submission (armbar)
| Shark Fights 4: Richards vs Schoonover
| 
| align=center| 1
| align=center| 0:48
| Lubbock, Texas, United States
| 
|-
| Loss
| align=center| 7–3
| Danny Castillo
| Decision (split)
| WEC 39: Brown vs. Garcia
| 
| align=center| 3
| align=center| 5:00
| Corpus Christi, Texas, United States
| 
|-
| Win
| align=center| 7–2
| Rafael Dias
| Decision (unanimous)
| GFC - Evolution
| 
| align=center| 3
| align=center| 5:00
| Columbus, Ohio, United States
| 
|-
| Win
| align=center| 6–2
| Patrick Horner
| Submission (armbar)
| GFC - Team Gracie vs Team Hammer House
| 
| align=center| 1
| align=center| 4:20
| Columbus, Ohio, United States
| 
|-
| Loss
| align=center| 5–2
| Steve Kinnison
| KO (slam)
| FFC 6 - No Love
| 
| align=center| 1
| align=center| 1:35
| Biloxi, Mississippi, United States
| 
|-
| Win
| align=center| 5–1
| Rocky Long
| Submission (armbar)
| REF - Renegades Extreme Fighting
| 
| align=center| 1
| align=center| 0:49
| Houston, Texas, United States
| 
|-
| Win
| align=center| 4–1
| Jose Santibanez
| Submission (guillotine Choke)
| REF - Renegades Extreme Fighting
| 
| align=center| 1
| align=center| 0:27
| Houston, Texas, United States
| 
|-
| Win
| align=center| 3–1
| Richard Rosas
| Submission (strikes)
| WFC 2 - World Fighting Championships 2
| 
| align=center| 1
| align=center| N/A
| El Paso, Texas, United States
| 
|-
| Win
| align=center| 2–1
| Casey Erwin
| Submission (triangle Choke)
| WFC 1 - World Fighting Championships 1
| 
| align=center| 1
| align=center| N/A
| San Antonio, Texas, United States
| 
|-
| Loss
| align=center| 1–1
| Randall Ebarb
| Submission (armbar)
| REF - Renegades Extreme Fighting
| 
| align=center| 1
| align=center| 1:02
| Texas, United States
| 
|-
| Win
| align=center| 1–0
| Chris Winchester
| Submission (armbar)
| REF - Renegades Extreme Fighting
| 
| align=center| 1
| align=center| 0:24
| Texas, United States
|

References

External links

Official website
Official website for Relson Gracie Austin

1976 births
Living people
American male mixed martial artists
Mixed martial artists utilizing taekwondo
Mixed martial artists utilizing hapkido
Mixed martial artists utilizing Brazilian jiu-jitsu
American male taekwondo practitioners
American hapkido practitioners
American practitioners of Brazilian jiu-jitsu
People awarded a black belt in Brazilian jiu-jitsu